Maximiliaan of Egmont (1509–1548) was Count of Buren and Leerdam, and Stadtholder of Friesland (succeeding George Schenck) from 1540 until 1548. He was the son of Floris van Egmont whom he succeeded as count after his father's death in 1539.

Biography
Maximiliaan van Egmond was born in 1509.  He studied Ancient Greek at the Catholic University of Leuven in 1516 and was a friend of the 16th century intellectual Erasmus. By 1528, he was at the court of Érard de La Marck, Prince-Bishop of Liege.

In 1537, he was in the service of the Holy Roman Emperor Charles V and was made a member of the Order of the Golden Fleece for distinguishing himself as military commander of the Dutch army against France. He later saw action in the Schmalkaldic War from 1546 to 1547.
Maximilian married Françoise de Lannoy in 1531 and had one child, Anna van Egmont, who later married William the Silent, Prince of Orange in 1551.
In England he is remembered as an ally of Henry VIII during the period of war between England, Scotland and France (1544–1551) known as The Rough Wooing. After the 1544 siege of Boulogne-sur-Mer Egmont presented the king with the basilisk Queen Elizabeth's Pocket Pistol as a gift for his young daughter the future Elizabeth I.

Death
He died of sickness in 1548, attended by the surgeon Vesalius. On his death bed he wore full armor and drank to the health of the Holy Roman Emperor.

References

1509 births
1548 deaths
Dutch nobility
Maximiliaan
People from IJsselstein